KLMX (1450 AM) is a radio station broadcasting a Christian format. Licensed to Clayton, New Mexico, United States, the station is currently owned by Melba McCollum.

References

External links

Christian radio stations in New Mexico